Qingshui Township (Mandarin: 清水乡) is a township in Xunhua Salar Autonomous County, Haidong, Qinghai, China. In 2010, Qingshui Township had a total population of 13,545 people: 6,656 males and 6,889 females: 3,822 under 14 years old, 8,897 aged between 15 and 64 and 826 over 65 years old.

References 

Township-level divisions of Qinghai
Haidong